The position of President of the New Hampshire Senate was created when the New Hampshire Senate was founded in 1784.

References

Presidents of the New Hampshire Senate

1784 establishments in New Hampshire